York—Simcoe is a provincial electoral district in Ontario, Canada, that has been represented in the Legislative Assembly of Ontario since the 2007 provincial election.

It covers part of the region north of Toronto by Lake Simcoe. The riding includes the municipalities of Bradford West Gwillimbury, East Gwillimbury, Georgina and King north of Regional Road 31. It also includes the community of the Chippewas of Georgina Island First Nation Indian Reserve.

The provincial electoral district was created in 1999 when provincial ridings were defined to have the same borders as federal ridings.

Members of Provincial Parliament

Election results

2007 electoral reform referendum

References

Sources
Elections Ontario Past Election Results
2018 Riding Map

Ontario provincial electoral districts
East Gwillimbury
Georgina, Ontario
Politics of King, Ontario